= SSE Arena =

SSE Arena may refer to:

- O2 Arena, formerly the SSE Arena, Belfast, Northern Ireland
- OVO Arena Wembley, formerly the SSE Arena Wembley, London, England
- OVO Hydro, formerly the SSE Hydro, Glasgow, Scotland
